266P/Christensen is a periodic comet in the Solar System. It will next come to perihelion in December 2026. It has been suggested as the source of the 1977 "Wow! Signal".

References

External links 
 Orbital simulation from JPL (Java) / Horizons Ephemeris
 266P on Seiichi Yoshida's comet list
 Elements and Ephemeris for 266P/Christensen – Minor Planet Center

Periodic comets
0266
266P
20061027